Nick Drnaso (born 1989 in Palos Hills, Illinois) is an American author and graphic novelist, best known for his books Beverly (2016, Drawn and Quarterly) and Sabrina (2018, Drawn and Quarterly), the latter being the first graphic novel nominated for a Man Booker Prize in 2018.

Bibliography

References

1989 births
Living people
American graphic novelists
The New Yorker people
People from Palos Hills, Illinois